Allothele is a genus of African spiders in the family Euagridae. It was first described by R. W. E. Tucker in 1920.

Species
 it contains five species:
Allothele australis (Purcell, 1903) – South Africa
Allothele caffer (Pocock, 1902) (type) – South Africa
Allothele malawi Coyle, 1984 – Malawi, South Africa
Allothele regnardi (Benoit, 1964) – Congo, Angola
Allothele teretis Tucker, 1920 – South Africa

References

Euagridae
Mygalomorphae genera
Spiders of Africa